General elections were held in Panama on 6 May 1984, electing both a new President of the Republic and a new Legislative Assembly.

Background
Under October 1978 legislation, eight parties had met quotas of 30,000 valid signatures by 1 April 1983, in order to legally nominate candidates in future elections.

On 24 April 1983, the electorate overwhelmingly approved by popular referendum a number of amendments to the 1972 Constitution. Among the changes proposed is the replacement of the existing 505-member National Assembly of Municipal Representatives by a national legislature of 70 members, and empowering this body to appoint high-ranking government officials, which until now was left to the President of the Republic.

In August 1983 law created an Electoral Tribunal consisting of one each member appointed by the executive, legislative and judicial branches. The tribunal was given ultimate authority to interpret and implement electoral rules. A national vote-counting board was formed to process election returns and report to the Electoral Tribunal.

General Paredes, in keeping with the new constitutional provision that no active Guard member could participate in an election, reluctantly retired from the Guard on 12 August 1983. He was succeeded immediately by Noriega, who was promoted to brigadier general. During the same month, Paredes was nominated as the PRD candidate for president. National elections were only five months away, and Paredes appeared to be the leading presidential contender. Nevertheless, in early September, President de la Espriella purged his cabinet of Paredes loyalists, and Noriega declared that he would not publicly support any candidate for president. These events convinced Paredes that he had no official government or military backing for his candidacy. He withdrew from the presidential race on 6 September 1983, less than a month after retiring from the Guard. Although Paredes subsequently gained the support of the Popular Nationalist Party (PNP) and was able to appear on the 1984 ballot, he was no longer a major presidential contender. Constitutional reforms notwithstanding, the reality of Panamanian politics dictated that no candidate could become president without the backing of the National Guard and, especially, its commander.

President Ricardo de la Espriella resigned on 13 February 1984 and his vice-president Jorge Illueca assumed the presidency. The resignation of President and his cabinet was barely noticed during the intense election campaign. De la Espriella was forced out by Noriega, having "opposed the military's manipulation of the election and strongly advocated free elections for 1984".

The two primary candidates in the presidential race were opposition candidate Arnulfo Arias and Noriega's selection, Ardito Barletta. Due to the near total media control of Noriega's Revolutionary Democratic Party (PRD), the only media outlet to endorse Arias was the independent newspaper La Prensa.

Conduct
"Preelection reports suggested that the procedures enacted during 1982-1984 to ensure a free and fair national election would achieve that result. Events on and after election day, however, were tainted with fraud. The vote count was stopped early and then suspended three days later, on 9 May. On 12 May, the tallies stood at 319,671 for Nicolás Ardito Barletta Vallarino and 314,714 for Arnulfo Arias, but the trend, with challenges, was favoring Arias. On 16 May, the Tribunal declared Barletta's victory. Of some 640,000 votes cast, they found Barletta the winner by 1,713 votes. The process looked suspicious: the announcement came ten days after the election, and one of the three members of the Tribunal abstained".

Results

President

National Assembly

Aftermath
On 13 September 1985, a long-time opponent of Manuel Noriega, Hugo Spadafora, was murdered by Panamanian Defense Forces officers. President Barletta called for an investigation of Spadafora's death and allegations of Panamanian Defense Forces complicity. These actions, in conjunction with a power struggle between Roberto Díaz Herrera and Noriega, caused the Panamanian Defense Forces to oust this increasingly unpopular president.

Barletta resigned on 27 September 1985, and was replaced by First Vice-President Eric Arturo Delvalle who promised to return to "Torrijista principles".

"In 1987, the situation grew more critical, producing paralysis within the Panamanian Defense Forces. The crisis came to a head in June 1987 when Colonel Roberto Díaz Herrera, recently retired head of the Panamanian Defense Forces High Command, denounced the internal management of General Noriega's military organization. Díaz Herrera's act was the first public manifestation of a breach. In the face of the Panamanian Defense Forces's demonstrated weakness, the political sector began to mobilize and call for a confrontation with the military. Following the leadership of groups that appeared to have little political experience, they formed the 'Cruzada Civilista' for the purpose of overthrowing the Eric Arturo Delvalle government and convening a 'constituyente' assembly to draw up a new constitution".

"By late February 1988 the crisis further deepened as Eric Arturo Delvalle attempted to fire Noriega from the Panamanian Defense Forces. Instead, Eric Arturo Delvalle was sacked by the Panamanian Defense Forces-controlled National Assembly and Manuel Solis Palma was elected 'minister in charge of the presidency'''".

References

General election
Elections in Panama
Panama
Presidential elections in Panama